Basta che non si sappia in giro is a 1976 Italian anthology  comedy film directed by Luigi Comencini, Nanni Loy and Luigi Magni. The film obtained a good commercial success.

Plot 
In a triptych of events (the first directed by Loy, the second by Magni, the third by Comencini) are analyzed situations and incidents that have sexuality as a common denominator.
In the first a scriptwriter / director (Johnny Dorelli), during a busy morning's work with a typist (Monica Vitti), feels more and more attracted to her, and this is increasingly identified with the protagonist 's erotic drama that he makes typing .
The second segment sees a jailer ( Nino Manfredi ) taken hostage during a prison riot, during which the mutineers threaten to sodomize him if they do not receive the visit of the Minister of Justice.
The third, played on the register of the comedy of misunderstanding, sees a single accountant with the hobby of model (still Manfredi) to exchange for the call girl who just "ordered" a shy and awkward phone used (again Vitti) responsible for collecting the rate of an encyclopedia.

Cast

Macchina d'amore 
 Monica Vitti: Armanda 
 Johnny Dorelli: Antonio Bormioli

Il superiore 
 Nino Manfredi: Enzo Lucarelli 
 Vittorio Mezzogiorno: Lupo
 Lino Banfi: Prison governor
 Isa Danieli: Ersilia Lucarelli 
 Marzio Honorato: Head of the Revolt  
 Luca Sportelli: Barbagliati

L'equivoco 
 Nino Manfredi: Paolo Gallizzi 
 Monica Vitti: Lia
 Mauro Vestri: Lia's colleague
 Ada Pometti: Prostitute

See also 
 List of Italian films of 1976

References

External links
 

1976 films
Commedia all'italiana
Films directed by Luigi Comencini
Films directed by Nanni Loy
Films directed by Luigi Magni
Films with screenplays by Age & Scarpelli
1976 comedy films
Films set in Rome
1970s Italian-language films
1970s Italian films